Kitchen Superstar is a 2011 Philippine television reality competition cooking show broadcast by GMA Network. Hosted by Marvin Agustin, it premiered on April 4, 2011 replacing Kapuso Movie Festival. The show concluded on July 1, 2011 with a total of 63 episodes.

Premise
The program sought to discover the best non-professional cook in the Philippines. The contestants were selected from auditions in National Capital Region, Pangasinan, Pampanga, Davao City, Naga, Cebu and Iloilo.

The prizes for the winner; PH₱ 1,000,000, a chance to shine as a culinary A-lister and to star in his/her own cooking show.

Three from each audition area will be chosen to compete with other contestants in Manila. The contestants compete in kitchen showdowns; Mega Showdown, Prize Showdown and Elimination Showdown.

Contestants
Top 15
 Teresa "Ting" Lledo – Pangasinan - winner
 Arabella "Ara" Padilla – NCR
 Teresa "Ting" Lledo – Pangasinan
 TJ Temelo – Iloilo
 Judiel "Jude" Trogani – Iloilo - Eliminated, June 21, 2011
 Janice Andaya – Pangasinan - Eliminated, June 27, 2011
 Maria Riza Santos – Pampanga - Eliminated, June 13, 2011
 Aileen Asilom – Davao - Quit, June 3, 2011
 Maria Marlene Carlos – NCR - Eliminated, May 31, 2011
 Michael John "MJ" Nicasio – Cebu - Eliminated, May 31, 2011
 Red Zamora – Iloilo - Eliminated, May 18, 2011
 Fe Dorina "Dorie" De Paz – NCR - Eliminated, May 13, 2011
 Sonny Azarcon – Naga - Eliminated, May 6, 2011
 Dolph Gonzales – Pangasinan - Eliminated, April 29, 2011
 Joer Rosal – Naga - Eliminated, April 19, 2011

Ratings
According to AGB Nielsen Philippines' Mega Manila household television ratings, the pilot episode of Kitchen Superstar earned a 13.6% rating. While the final episode scored a 4.3% rating in Mega Manila People/Individual television rating.

References

External links
 

2011 Philippine television series debuts
2011 Philippine television series endings
Filipino-language television shows
GMA Network original programming
GMA Integrated News and Public Affairs shows
Philippine reality television series